The Center for Gun Policy and Research is a research center at the Johns Hopkins Bloomberg School of Public Health dedicated to researching ways to reduce gun violence in the United States. The center's current director is Daniel Webster, and its co-director is Jon Vernick.

History
The Center for Gun Policy and Research was formally established in 1995, with Stephen Teret as founding director. Teret served as the center's director from 1995 to 2001.

Faculty
In addition to Webster, Vernick, and Teret, other notable Center for Gun Policy and Research faculty members include Shannon Frattaroli, Colleen Barry, and Sheldon Greenberg.

Funding
The Center for Gun Policy and Research receives and/or has received funding from, among other sources, The Annie E. Casey Foundation, The David Bohnett Foundation, The David and Lucile Packard Foundation, The Funders' Collaborative for Gun Violence Prevention, The John D. and Catherine T. MacArthur Foundation, The Joyce Foundation, The Overbrook Foundation, The Richard and Rhoda Goldman Fund, Bloomberg Philanthropies, and The Harold Simmons Foundation. The center's website, as well as Webster, have said that the research conducted there is done independently of any funding source.

References

Johns Hopkins University
1995 establishments in Maryland
Research institutes in Maryland
Research institutes established in 1995